Reidar Magnus Aamo (5 August 1898 – 29 March 1972) was a Norwegian politician for the Labour Party.

He was born in Os.

He was elected to the Norwegian Parliament from Hedmark in 1950, and was re-elected on three occasions. He had previously served as a deputy representative in the period 1945–1949, during which he served as a regular representative meanwhile Kristian Fjeld was appointed to Gerhardsen's Second Cabinet.

On the local level, Aamo was also involved in local politics in Tolga and Os municipalities, both before and after the Second World War.

Outside politics he was a farmer and miner before becoming editor-in-chief of Arbeidets Rett from 1932 to 1941. At that point he returned to farming.

References

1898 births
1972 deaths
Members of the Storting
Labour Party (Norway) politicians
Hedmark politicians
Norwegian newspaper editors
20th-century Norwegian politicians